The Maska are a tribe of the Hazara people in Afghanistan and neighboring countries.

Maska is a sub-tribe of the Jaghori tribe of Hazaras in Afghanistan. For a long time ago Maska and Babah were twin brothers and according to the old myth, they were separated by knife. In Afghanistan, their ancestral place is Sange-e-Masha in the Jaghori District of Ghazni Province.

Clans of Maska
 Aaka
 Akhka
 Aldiyaar
 Alumbaig
 Daama
 Dada
 Faquiro
 Ikhtiar
 Jamag
 Mehtar
 Naib
 Nouta
 Ourdu
 Paidga
 Pashumbee
 Rozee
 Shadi
 Shah Dost
 Wakil
 Yaree

Maska counsel of Quetta

The existence of Hazara Tribe since 1890 in this region, the deformation of Hazara Pioneer and the migration from Loralai Zhob and other parts of British India here in Quetta city made cause to establish a sub tribe in Hazara Community. The literacy proved a role in as the literate people of Maska community did play a significant role for an individual of this community in Hazara Society. Beside all that efforts a class in the community tried to derive the hole by their wish and desire, those were the third grade retired Police men and later the good governance of retired officer group was set correct.

The role of (Late) Major (R) Niaz Ali as the president of this community is unforgettable, during his term the community was much in strengthen position and each and every clans of this tribe was in contact with central committee also they played a positive role for the betterment of individual. The second reward goes to Haji Muhammad Ali Jaffery, his efforts for the unity of this community with in the Hazara Society is recognised as he had a directive goals. For a period of time there was a pause in community activity as many tied to play their role but the mentality of a handicap is always destruction.

Firsts this counsel need a general survey of this tribe that how many people are in contact with their group, how many are out as that will form a true settlement and organisation. There seen a game of power by few people among this tribe whom try to drive this by their will.

Many of the top heads of this tribe are not aware of this election and their participation, the activity of counsel are often seen during provincial and national assembly elections after five year.

Office Barriers
By the year 2018 the under mentioned office barriers are no more on their position as they reached to the time and expired.

 Kazim Ali Darogha (ex President)
 Ali Yawar (ex Vice President)
 Mehdi Ali (ex Vice President)
 Barat Ali (ex Vice President)
 Abdul Wahid (ex General Secretary)
 Manzoor Hussain (ex Joint Secretary)
 Haji Sadiq Ali (ex Treasurer)

Members

 Haji Ahmed Ali Tawakkuli (Demised)
 Rehmat Ullah
 Haji Habib
 Abbas Ali
 Abdul Hakim
 Salman Ali Noor
 Haji Iqbal Ali
 Haji Nouroz Ali
 Mehdi Hussain
 Qurban Ali
 Haji Ali Jan
 Haji Imdad Ali Changezi

Maska Branch Tree

لطفا بنوسید برار قوم

See also 
 List of Hazara tribes

References

Hazara people
Hazara tribes